Everyday World of Bodies is the fourth studio album by Burning Star Core, released on in December 2006 by Ultra Eczema.

Track listing

Personnel
Adapted from the Everyday World of Bodies liner notes.
 Ron Orovitz – electronics (B2)
 C. Spencer Yeh – Roland synthesizer, electronics, tape, voice
Production and additional personnel
 Dennis Faes – cover art
 Kevin Van Gaver – design

Release history

References

External links 
 Everyday World of Bodies at Discogs (list of releases)

2006 albums
Burning Star Core albums
Instrumental albums